Denton Zubke (born August 21, 1954) is an American politician who has served in the North Dakota House of Representatives from the 39th district since 2014.

References

1954 births
Living people
People from McKenzie County, North Dakota
Republican Party members of the North Dakota House of Representatives
21st-century American politicians